Fritz August Landgren (7 January 1891 – 12 November 1977) was a Swedish footballer, co-founder and chairman of the Swedish association football club Malmö FF, a post he held for three periods, first between 1916 and 1918, then between 1922 and 1926, and finally between 1929 and 1934. Landgren also played as goalkeeper for the club between 1910 and 1915. This was before the days of league football in Sweden.

References

Swedish sports executives and administrators
Malmö FF chairmen
Malmö FF players
1891 births
1977 deaths
Swedish footballers
Association football goalkeepers